Bahuka may refer to:

 Bahu (Bahuka), a king of the Solar dynasty founded by the legendary Indian king Ikshvaku
 Bahuka (Nala), a character from the Mahābhārata who temporarily bore the name "Bahuka"
 Bahuk, a Gujarati narrative poem by Chinu Modi which is eponymously named after Bahuka (Nala) who is its central character